The canton of Attignat is an administrative division of the Ain department, in eastern France. It was created at the French canton reorganisation which came into effect in March 2015. Its seat is in Attignat.

Composition

It consists of the following communes:
 
Attignat
Béréziat
Bresse Vallons
Buellas
Confrançon
Curtafond
Foissiat
Jayat
Malafretaz
Marsonnas
Montcet
Montracol
Montrevel-en-Bresse
Polliat 
Saint-Didier-d'Aussiat
Saint-Martin-le-Châtel
Saint-Sulpice
Vandeins

Councillors

Pictures of the canton

References

Cantons of Ain